Wesley Van der Linden (born 7 March 1982 in Geraardsbergen, East Flanders) is a Belgian professional racing cyclist.

Career highlights 

2000
 1st, Stage 2, Heuvelland Tweedaagse
 2nd, National U19 Cyclo-Cross Championship, Gent (Blaarmeersen)
2001
 2nd, GP Claude Criquielion
 2nd, Ruddervoorde, Cyclo-cross, U23
2003
  U23 Cyclo-Cross Champion, Wielsbeke
 , World U23 Cyclo-Cross Championship, Monopoli
 2nd, Schulteiss-Cup, Cyclo-cross
 3rd, Romsée - Stavelot - Romsée
2004
  U23 Cyclo-Cross Champion, Lille
 1st, Stage 5a, Circuito Montañés, Santander (La Atalaya)
 1st, Asteasu, Cyclo-cross
 1st, Harnes, Cyclo-cross, U23
 2nd, Vorselaar, Cyclo-cross, U23
2005
 1st, Asteasu, Cyclo-cross
 1st, Idiazabal, Cyclo-cros
 1st, Ispaster, Cyclo-cross
2007
 1st, Vendin, Cyclo-cross
 2nd, Le Quesnoy, Cyclo-cross
2008
 1st, Ispaster, Cyclo-cross

External links

1982 births
Living people
People from Geraardsbergen
Belgian male cyclists
Cyclists from East Flanders